Greshamville is an unincorporated community in Greene County, in the U.S. state of Georgia.

History
A post office called Greshamville was established in 1877, and remained in operation until 1953. The community most likely was named after Volney Gresham.

References

Unincorporated communities in Greene County, Georgia
Unincorporated communities in Georgia (U.S. state)